Mengjiang, also known as Mengkiang or the Mongol Border Land, officially referred to as the Mengjiang United Autonomous Government, was an autonomous area in Inner Mongolia, formed in 1939 as a puppet state of the Empire of Japan, then from 1940 being under the nominal sovereignty of the Reorganized National Government of the Republic of China (which was itself also a puppet state). It consisted of the previously Chinese provinces of Chahar and Suiyuan, corresponding to the central part of modern Inner Mongolia. It has also been called Mongukuo or Mengguguo (or Mengkukuo; ; in analogy to Manchukuo, another Japanese puppet state in Manchuria). The capital was Kalgan, from where it was under the nominal rule of Mongol nobleman Demchugdongrub. The territory returned to Chinese control after the defeat of the Japanese Empire in 1945.

Background 
Following Japan's occupation of Manchuria in 1931 and the establishment of the puppet state of Manchukuo, Japan sought to expand its influence in Mongolia and North China. In a series of actions, starting in 1933, the armies of Manchukuo and Japan occupied Chahar and in 1936 proclaimed itself the independent Mongol Military Government, allied with Japan under Prince Demchugdongrub. 
 
In 1936 and 1937, similar operations in Suiyuan saw the occupation and absorption of that province also.

History 
Formed on May 12, 1936, the Mongol Military Government (蒙古軍政府) had Prince Yondonwangchug of Ulanqab as its first chairman. It was renamed in October 1937 as the Mongol United Autonomous Government (蒙古聯盟自治政府). On September 1, 1939, the predominantly Han Chinese governments of South Chahar and North Shanxi were merged with the Mongol United Autonomous Government, creating the new Mengjiang United Autonomous Government (蒙疆聯合自治政府). The capital was established at Zhangbei (Changpei), near Kalgan (Zhangjiakou), with the government's control extending around Hohhot. On August 4, 1941, it was again renamed: the Mongolian Autonomous Federation (蒙古自治邦).

In 1939 Wang Jingwei reorganized the remnants of the occupied Chinese government for a Japanese puppet state, commonly referred to as the Wang Jingwei Regime, or the Reorganized National Government, with its capital in Nanjing. Mengjiang was nominally incorporated into the regime in 1940, though it remained autonomous from Nanjing.

Mengjiang capitulated in 1945 when it was invaded by the Soviet Red Army and Mongol Red Army as part of the Manchurian Strategic Offensive Operation. Most of the area, with the notable exception of Kalgan, is now part of Inner Mongolia in the People's Republic of China.

Politics

Institutions 
Mongolian Royal Family
Japanese Central Academy of Kalgan
Directorate General of Communications
Bank of Mengjiang
Mongolian Military Command Headquarters
Mengjiang National Army
United Autonomous Mongolian Aimags
Autonomous Government of Northern Shanxi
Autonomous Government of Southern Chahar
The United Autonomous Government of Mengjiang
Government Mongol administrative uls
People’s Autonomous Government of Eastern Mongolia
Inner Mongolia Pailingmiao Autonomous Political Council (Mongolian political movement)

People 
Demchugdongrub: Khungtayji Head of State; Commander of the Mongolian Military Command Headquarters
Li Shouxin: Chahar warlord, Chief of Staff of the Inner Mongolian Army (1937-1945)
Yondonwangchug: First Chairman of Mengjiang (1936-1938)
Altanochir: Minister of Communications, Head of the Mongolian Cultural Centre, Rector of the Mongolian Academy
Altanochir (1882-1949): Deputy Head of Ordos City, General commander of the Ordos army
Wu Heling: Director of the Counseling Bureau and Sub-General, Chairman of the House, President of the Preparatory School for Studying in Japan
Jodbajab: Commander of the Mongol Militia, Deputy commander of the Pao An Tui
Xia Gong: Supreme Member of the Northern Shanxi Autonomous Government, Vice-Chairman of the Mongolian United Autonomous Government
Cui Xiaoqian: Director of the Department of Finance (1937-1939), Member of the Mengjiang Bank Committee
Yu Pinqing: Supreme Member of the Southern Chahar Autonomous Government, Vice-Chairman of the Mongolian Autonomous Federation
Wang Ying (ROC): Commander of the Grand Han Righteous Army, Chinese bandit and Warlord   
Gen Sugiyama: Commanding General of the Mongolia Garrison Army
Sadamu Shimomura: Commander of Mongolia Garrison Army
Hideki Tōjō: Commander of the 1st Independent Mixed Brigade, Chahar Expeditionary Force
Kitsuju Ayabe: Colonel, engaged in Chahar area operation as Staff Officer, Kwantung Army, North China Detachment
Torashirō Kawabe: Military advisor

Name 

Mengjiang, meaning "Mongol Territories", came from the acceptance speech of chairmanship by Demchugdongrub:
 To recover the territories originally owned by the Mongols
 (收復蒙古固有疆土)

Economy 

The Japanese established the Bank of Mengjiang that printed its own currency without years on it. Some traditional local money shops also made currency with the Chinese year numbering system, such as the Jiachen Year (甲辰年), on it.

The Japanese had mineral interests in their created state of Mengjiang. In one example the Japanese put the iron mine in Xuanhua Longyan into production, with a reserve of 91,645,000 tonnes in 1941; and analyzed the reserves of coal in land, one was 504 tonnes, and another with a potential production of 202,000 of tonnes (1934).

The Mengjiang iron deposits were exported directly to Japan. At the same time, the Japanese sought the coal reserves of Suiyuan (another Mengjiang occupied sector), including one of 417 million tonnes, and one with a potential extraction of 58,000 tonnes in 1940.

Military 

The Mengjiang National Army was the Japanese-created native army organized in Mengjiang; not to be confused with the Mongol Army. It was a Kwantung Army special force group under direct command, having native commanders alongside Japanese commanding officers, as in other auxiliary outer sections of the Kwantung Army.

The purpose of the army was to support any eventual Japanese operations against Outer Mongolia (Mongolian People's Republic), or the north China areas, and to act as a local security force, with the local police forces. It also had the duty of protecting Prince De Wang, the head of state, and the Mengjiang native establishment and local government properties.

The army was equipped with rifles, pistols, light and medium machine guns, mortars and some artillery and anti-aircraft guns. It was organised as a mobile cavalry and light infantry force with little artillery support and no tanks or aircraft.

History 

In 1936, the Inner Mongolian Army was armed with Mauser rifles and they had 200 machine guns: mostly the Czechoslovak ZB-26 and a few Swiss Sig. Model 1930 submachine gun for Teh Wang's 1,000 bodyguard troops. They had 70 artillery pieces, mostly mortars and a few captured Chinese mountain and field guns of a variety of types (making ammo and spare parts a problem). The few tanks and armored cars were captured Chinese vehicles crewed by Japanese.

After the Suiyuan Campaign, the Mengjiang National Army was rebuilt from the defeated remnants of the Inner Mongolian Army, the new eight Mongol cavalry Divisions were 1,500 men strong, in three regiments of 500 men. Each regiment were to have three Saber companies and a machine gun company of 120 men. However these divisions actually ranged in size from 1,000 men to 2,000 men (8th Division).

In 1939, the ethnic Chinese troops in the Mongol Divisions were brigaded together in the 1st, 2nd and 3rd Divisions and turned into the 1st, 2nd and 3rd Ch'ing An Tui Brigades of the "Mongolian Pacification Force" and used against various guerrilla groups.

In 1943, the Mongol 4th and 5th Divisions were combined to form a new 8th Division and the old 7th and 8th Divisions formed the new 9th Division. Strength of the army was between 4,000–10,000 men, all cavalry at this time and had little heavy equipment.

The Mengjiang state also had 5 Defense Divisions in 1943, made up of local militia and other security forces, nominally of three regiments. Apparently only one of these regiments in each division was capable of operations. In 1944, the Japanese reorganized them along with the Chahar garrisons into four Divisions of 2,000 men each.

At the end of the war, a total of six divisions (two Cavalry and four Infantry), three Independent Ch'ing An Tui Brigades and a "Pao An Tui" Security Force Regiment made up the Army.

The sole secondary language which could be taught in schools was Japanese while students were forced to pay respect to the Emperor of Japan and Shinto. The government and army of Mengjiang were complete puppets of the Japanese.

See also 
 Collaborationist Chinese Army
 Inner Mongolian Army
 Inner Mongolian People's Party
 Japanese imperialism
 List of East Asian leaders in the Japanese sphere of influence (1931-1945)
 Manchukuo
 Treaty of friendship and alliance between the Government of Mongolia and Tibet
 Wang Jingwei Government

Citations

General sources 
 Jowett, Phillip S. Rays of the Rising Sun: Armed Forces of Japan's Asian Allies 1931–45. Volume I: China & Manchuria. Solihull: Helion, 2004.

External links 

 Mengjiang flag
 Mongolian education under the Japanese regime

 
States and territories disestablished in 1945
Former countries in Chinese history
Former countries in East Asia
States and territories established in 1939
Axis powers
Japan–Mongolia relations
 
History of Zhangjiakou